Anita Caprioli (born 11 December 1973) is an Italian theatre and film actress.

Biography
Born in Vercelli, Piedmont, the daughter of a stage actress, Caprioli made her stage debut in London in 1995 with Andrea Brooks, in an adaptation of Carlo Goldoni's The Mistress of the Inn, and in the following year she starred in Luigi Pirandello's Il Berretto a Sonagli.

In 1997 she took part to her first movie, We All Fall Down, by Davide Ferrario, followed by La donna del treno, directed by Carlo Lizzani.

In 2008 she earned a nomination to Nastro d'Argento for Best Supporting Actress for Non pensarci. In  2012 she was nominated to the David di Donatello for Best Supporting Actress thanks to her performance in Heavenly Body.

Filmography

We All Fall Down (1997)
Fireworks (1997)
Donne in bianco (1998)
20 - Venti (Twenty, 1999)
Senza movente (1999)
L'uomo della fortuna (2000)
Denti (2000)
Vajont (2001)
Santa Maradona (2001)
Sei come sei (2002)
Il sorriso di Diana (2002)
It Can't Be All Our Fault (2003)
Cime tempestose (2004)
Manual of Love (2005)
Cielo e terra (2005)
Mario's War (2005)
Onde (2005)
One Out of Two (2006)
The Demons of St. Petersberg (2007)
Non pensarci (2008)
Si può fare (2008)
Good Morning Aman (2009)
Meu País (2011)
Interno giorno (2011)
Heavenly Body (2011)
The Immature (2011)
Kryptonite! (2012)
The Immature: The Trip (2012)
First Snowfall (2013)
The Predators (2020)

References

External links

1973 births
Living people
People from Vercelli
Italian actresses